Imrahor Ilyas Bey was an Ottoman Albanian military commander and governor, who served sultan Bayezid II. He married the daughter of sultan Mehmet II and founded the town of Korçë in Albania in the 15th century.

Biography

Iljaz was born in Panarit, Korçë District and entered Janissary service probably during the reign of Murad II. He had three sons: Muhammed, Inebey and Sefershah.

He was one of the most loyal subjects of the young emperor Mehmet II, and dedicated his life to the service of the Emperor against Skanderbeg and his forces. In the year 1453, Iljaz Hoxha's role in the Siege of Constantinople earned him the title Mirahor (General of Cavalry). Later he received the Mirahor Evel title (Head General). After the conquest he became the sanjak-bey of Korçë (now in Albania). Under the command of Mehmet II he founded and developed Korçë as both a cultural center and garrison city. He constructed its first mosque, the Mirahori Mosque.

The Frashëri brothers Abdul (1839-1892), Naim (1846-1900) and Sami (1850-1904) were descendants of Ilyas Bey through their mother Emine who was from Korçë. Sami Frashëri in his publications wrote about his ancestor Ilyas Bey. Sami Frashëri writes in his Kamus al-Alam:  His türbe was destroyed by the Greek invading forces on 7 December 1912.

References

Bibliography

15th-century Albanian people
15th-century people from the Ottoman Empire
Albanian Muslims
Albanians from the Ottoman Empire
Military personnel of the Ottoman Empire
1408 births
People from Korçë
Fall of Constantinople